Easter Clune Castle is a ruined 16th-century tower house, about  south-west of Banchory, Aberdeenshire, Scotland, and south of the Water of Feugh

History
The castle is thought to have been built by Archbishop James Stewart or Archbishop Ross.

Structure 

Castles in Great Britain and Ireland
List of castles in Scotland

References

Castles in Aberdeenshire